Bradley R. Wardell (born June 24, 1971) is an American businessman, programmer, author and AI Engineer. He is the founder, president, and chief executive officer of Stardock, a software development and computer games company.

Wardell's specialty is the design and programming of artificial intelligence and game mechanics for turn-based strategy games.

Career

Early career
Wardell built PCs and worked as a check proofer while studying at Western Michigan University. He graduated in 1994 with a degree in Electronic Engineering, specializing in Computer Engineering.

Wardell was involved in the design and implementation of Galactic Civilizations for OS/2, one of the platform's few games. He led development of OS/2 Essentials, followed by Object Desktop, a package of utilities and desktop enhancements.

When the OS/2 market collapsed, he shifted Stardock to Windows, heading development of PC game Entrepreneur (now The Corporate Machine) while coordinating the creation of WindowBlinds and other Object Desktop components.

Wardell designed Galactic Civilizations for Windows and its sequel, which became GameSpy's Game of the Year. He subsequently designed The Political Machine and Elemental, as well as two expansions (Dark Avatar and Twilight of the Arnor) to Galactic Civilizations II.  In 2012 he was the producer of Elemental: Fallen Enchantress.

Computer customization
Wardell is co-founder and webmaster of WinCustomize, a site specializing in the distribution of skins and themes for computer software. Wardell was a designer of OS customization programs such as WindowBlinds, Fences (software), and Object Desktop. He was a regular on the PowerUser.TV podcast, run by WinCustomize and Neowin, and organized the GUI Olympics (later GUI Championships), a semi-annual skinning competition starting in 2002.

Video games
Wardell has programmed, designed or executive produced a substantial number of video games and is regularly interviewed by game industry sites regarding his views on technology, game publishing and trends.  His particular expertise has focused on parallel computing, AI, graphics APIs and strategy games. He has also presented at the Game Developer's Conference several times on topics ranging from code optimization to disasters in publishing. 

Wardell takes an approach to game development allowing users to view and influence the process of making games. Wardell is credited with multiple game projects either as a game designer or as an executive producer. Wardell is also an advocate for consumer rights for software and game customers and published the Gamer's Bill of Rights.

As designer 
 Galactic Civilizations for OS/2 (1994)
 Star Emperor (1996)
 Entrepreneur (1997)
 The Corporate Machine (2001)
 Galactic Civilizations(2003)
 The Political Machine (2004)
 Galactic Civilizations II (2006)
 Elemental: War of Magic (2010)
 Sorcerer King (2015)
 Ashes of the Singularity (2016)
 Galactic Civilizations III: Crusade (2017)

As Executive Producer
 Havok (1995)
 Trials of Battle (1996)
 Avarice (1996)
 Stellar Frontier (1997)
 Links Golf for OS/2 (1998)
 Sins of a Solar Empire (2008)
 Demigod (2009)
 Sins of a Solar Empire: Rebellion (2011)
 Elemental: Fallen Enchantress (2012)
 Elemental: Fallen Enchantress - Legendary Heroes (2013)
 Galactic Civilizations III (2015)
 Star Control: Origins (2018)

Digital Distribution 
Wardell was an early pioneer of digital distribution of games and software. Its digital distribution platform, Impulse, was sold to GameStop in 2011.

Co-Founder work 
In mid 2013, Stardock announced that it had promoted Derek Paxton to succeed Wardell in the running of Stardock Entertainment in order for Wardell to have more time for other projects. These other projects included co-founding new game studios  including Oxide Games and Mohawk Games with Soren Johnson. Wardell's goal was to encourage innovation and empower a new generation of 4X game developers. As part of this endeavor, Wardell founded the Stardock Staffing Company to allow developers and artists to work on projects between a coalition of game studios to provide better job security.

Author 
Wardell wrote the fantasy novel Elemental: Destiny's Embers, published by Del Rey to accompany Elemental: War of Magic. The book is set a thousand years after the Cataclysm, after the time of the game itself, and involves the quest of a former messenger to save mankind from the Fallen. The book came with a coupon to download an exclusive campaign for the game.

Views

Digital rights management
Wardell endorses digital distribution, despite the potential for piracy. He believes that while copyright infringement is an issue, blaming it for poor sales – and insisting on "stupid" forms of digital rights management – "hides other underlying causes." Indeed, he argues that extreme anti-piracy measures result in poor sales:

The reason why we don't put copy protection on our games isn't because we're nice guys. We do it because the people who actually buy games don't like to mess with it. Our customers make the rules, not the pirates.

Wardell says any system of protection "should be completely invisible to the user," and that it is not enough to make a good product while disrespecting your customers:

Stardock is consumer friendly because we're a bunch of greedy capitalists who have recognized what should be an obvious truth: If you treat people as potential customers and not potential criminals you are likely to get more sales.

To this end, Wardell created a "Gamers Bill of Rights," released at PAX 2008. Gas Powered Games' Chris Taylor – who was working with Stardock on Demigod at the time – called the bill "an awesome framework for the industry to aspire to."

Media bias
Wardell has commented on the Gamergate controversy, stating that "The media should acknowledge that there's a problem and that their customers are getting fed up with it" in response to a question about how the media should cover it.

Awards
Wardell was a member of Crain's Detroit's 40 under 40 in 2003, and has been a finalist for Ernst & Young's Michigan Entrepreneur of the Year in 2002-4 and 2007.

Personal life
Wardell has three children with his wife Debbie Wardell.

References

American video game designers
American technology chief executives
21st-century American novelists
American fantasy writers
American male novelists
1971 births
Living people
Western Michigan University alumni
People from Plymouth, Michigan
Stardock
21st-century American male writers